Adrienne Thomas was the pseudonym of Hertha A. Deutsch, nee Strauch (1897–1980), a German autobiographical novelist.

Life
Hertha Strauch was born in St Avold in Alsace-Lorraine, then part of Germany, on June 24, 1897. She grew up bilingual in German and French, going to school in Metz, where her family owned a small department store. During World War I she became a nurse for the Red Cross, at first in Metz and later in Berlin, where her family moved. During the 1920s she trained as a singer and actor at the Clara Lion Conservatory in Frankfurt.

Writing as Adrienne Thomas, she drew on her Red Cross experiences for her semi-autobiographical anti-war novel Die Katrin wird Soldat (Katrin Becomes a Soldier), the diary of a young Jewish girl serving behind the German lines as a relief worker. Published in 1930, the book was translated into sixteen languages.
When Adolf Hitler came to power in 1933 Thomas was forced to go into exile and her writings banned. After living in Austria, France and the United States, she eventually settled in Vienna in 1947.

Works
 Die Katrin wird Soldat: ein Roman aus Elsass-Lothringen' (Katrin Becomes a Soldier: a novel from Alsace-Lorraine). Berlin: Propyläen-Verlag, 1930.
 Translated by Margaret L. Goldsmith as Cathérine joins up, London: E. Mathews & Marrot, Ltd., 1931; Katrin becomes a soldier, Boston, Little, Brown, 1931.
 Dreiviertel Neugier: Roman, 1934
 Katrin! Die Welt brennt!: Roman, 1936. 
 Translated by Marguerite Wolff as Child of Unrest, London: Hutchinston & Co., 1937.
 Andrea: eine Erzählung von jungen Menschen , 1937
 Von Johanna zu Jane: Roman, 1939 
 Reisen Sie ab, Mademoiselle!, 1940
 Ein Fenster am East River, 1947
 Wettlauf mit dem Traum: Roman, 1949
 Da und ort'', 1950

References

1897 births
1980 deaths
People from Alsace-Lorraine
German autobiographers
German Red Cross personnel
Writers from Vienna
20th-century German novelists
20th-century German women writers
Women autobiographers
Date of death missing
20th-century pseudonymous writers
Pseudonymous women writers